Government Medical College and Hospital, a medical school and a tertiary care hospital is located in Chandigarh, India. The medical school is administered by Panjab University. It was established in 1991 and has a  campus located in Sector 32, Chandigarh.

Courses
The Medical College has an intake of 150 students towards the MBBS degree. It also offers Post-Graduate courses (M.Phil./MD/MS) in several medical and surgical subjects.

History

The Government Medical College, Chandigarh was started in the year 1991 in Prayaas building, Sector 38 as an attempt to establish a centre of undergraduate excellence to support the Post Graduate Institute of Medical Education and Research. The foundation stone was laid by the erstwhile Prime Minister of India, Chandra Shekhar on 20 January 1991 on land allotted by the Chandigarh Administration. Construction for this college and hospital started in 1991 itself.

Campus
The  campus is housed in Sector 32 and has 5 blocks of hospital and a dedicated building for the college.

Administration
GMCH is headed by a Director-Principal Jagjit Singh Chopra, a Padma Bhushan awardee, who served as the founder director-principal. The incumbent Director-Principal is Prof B S Chavan and he is assisted by Prof Ravi Gupta, the Medical Superintendent.

Rankings 

The college was ranked 10 among government medical colleges in India in 2022 by Outlook India.

References

External links
 

Medical colleges in Chandigarh
Hospitals in Punjab, India
Hospitals in Haryana
1991 establishments in Chandigarh
Hospitals established in 1991